Tenzer may refer to:

Herbert Tenzer (1905–1993), American Democratic Party politician
Michael Tenzer (born 1957), American composer, performer, and music educator and scholar
Morton J. Tenzer (born 1931), American political scientist

See also
 Tenzere, a folk dance